Gangnam-gu Office Station is a station on Seoul Subway Line 7 and the Suin-Bundang Line in the Gangnam district of Seoul.

The station serves the southern area of Apgujeong-dong, and is closer to various parts of Apgujeong than Apgujeong Station.

The Gangnam - University of California, Riverside (GNUCR) International Education Center and the SK Blue Hub building are adjacent to the station. The eponymous Gangnam-gu local government district headquarters is a short distance to the east of the station.

Station layout

Line 7

Bundang Line

Vicinity
Exit 1: Gangnam District Office, Eonju Middle School
Exit 2: Hakdong Elementary School
Exit 3: Yeongdong Central Market
Exit 4: Yeongdong High School

References

Railway stations opened in 2000
Seoul Metropolitan Subway stations
Metro stations in Gangnam District